The 1846 Vermont gubernatorial election took place on September 1, 1846, and resulted in the election of Whig Party candidate Horace Eaton to a one-year term as governor.

Statewide elections
In the race for governor, incumbent  lieutenant governor Horace Eaton defeated Smith, a former member of the United States House of Representatives and Brainerd, a former member of the Vermont House of Representatives.

In the popular vote for  lieutenant governor, Whig Leonard Sargeant defeated Democrat Truman B. Ransom and Free Soil candidate Jacob Scott. The vote totals were: Sargeant, 23,335 (47.4%); Ransom, 17,985 (36.6%); Scott, 7,801 (15.9%); scattering, 65 (0.1%).

The contest for state treasurer resulted in the election of Whig Elisha P. Jewett, who defeated Democrat Daniel Baldwin and Free Soil nominee Zenas Wood. Vote totals in the treasurer's race were: Jewett, 23,324 (48.2%); Baldwin, 17,847 (36.9%); Wood, 6,978 (14.4%); scattering, 192 (0.5%).

Because none of the popular vote winners achieved the 50 percent required by the Constitution of Vermont, the Vermont General Assembly was required to choose the winners. In most cases, the assembly selects the candidate who received a plurality of the vote. In the October 8, 1846 legislative elections, Eaton, Sargeant, and Jewett all won their contests. The reported vote totals were:

Governor
Necessary for a choice: 111

Results:
Eaton, 136
Smith, 75
Brainerd, 11

Lieutenant governor
Necessary for a choice: 112

Results:
Sargeant, 138
Ransom, 73
Scott, 12

Treasurer
Necessary for a choice: 111

Results:
Jewett, 138
Baldwin, 74
Wood, 12

Results

References

1846
Vermont
Gubernatorial
September 1846 events